Clinton Jones (born 24 May 1945) is a former professional American football player in the United States from 1967 until 1973.

College career
After his graduation from Cathedral Latin School in Cleveland, Ohio, Jones spent his college years at Michigan State University. He finished sixth in voting for the 1966 Heisman Award, the Michigan State Spartans second year in a row as national champions. He is featured in the documentary Through the Banks of the Red Cedar, written and directed by Gene Washington's daughter, Maya Washington.

College statistics
1964: 72 carries for 350 yards and one touchdown. 1 catch for 15 yards and one touchdown.
1965: 185 carries for 900 yards and 10 TD. 27 catches for 314 yards and 2 TD.
1966: 159 carries for 784 yards and 6 TD. 6 catches for 85 yards.

NFL career
Jones was drafted by the Minnesota Vikings in the 1967 NFL Draft. The pick used to draft Jones was one received by the Vikings from the New York Giants in exchange for the quarterback Fran Tarkenton.

Jones spent six seasons, 1967 to 1972, with Minnesota before moving on to the San Diego Chargers for one last season in 1973.

Clint Jones is a member of The Pigskin Club Of Washington, D.C. and National Intercollegiate All-American Football Players Honor Roll.

On January 9, 2015 Jones was named to the College Football Hall Of Fame.

His professional career highs were:

675 yards 1971
180 carries 1971
9 touchdowns 1970

References

External links
Clint Jones career statistics provided by Pro-Football-Reference.com.

1945 births
Living people
All-American college football players
American football running backs
Michigan State Spartans football players
Minnesota Vikings players
Players of American football from Cleveland
San Diego Chargers players